2003 in motoring includes developments in the automotive industry that occurred throughout the year 2003 by various automobile manufacturers, grouped by country. The automotive industry designs, develops, manufactures, markets, and sells motor vehicles, and is one of the Earth's most important economic sectors by revenue.

United Kingdom
The Aston Martin DB9 was launched, replacing the nine-year-old DB7.

France
The Peugeot 307 CC was launched after replacing the 306 Cabriolet.

The Peugeot 206 receives a facelift.

Japan
The Mazda RX-8 was the precessor to the RX-7, it is a 4-door quad coupe.
The Nissan 350Z is the replacement of the old 300ZX.

Motoring by year
2003 in transport